Limothrips is a genus of insects belonging to the family Thripidae.

The species of this genus are found in Europe, Australia and Northern America.

Species:
 Limothrips angulicornis Jablonowski, 1894 
 Limothrips cerealium (Haliday, 1836)

References

Thripidae
Thrips genera